Indic may refer to:

 Indic languages (disambiguation)
 Various scripts:
 Brahmic scripts, a family of scripts used to write Indian and other Asian languages
 Kharosthi (extinct)
 Indian numerals
 Indian religions, also known as the Dharmic religions
 Other things related to the Indian subcontinent

See also
 Inđić, a Serbian surname
 Indica (disambiguation)